Winfield USD 465 is a public unified school district headquartered in Winfield, Kansas, United States.  The district includes the communities of Winfield, Akron, Floral, Hackney, New Salem, Tisdale, and nearby rural areas.

Schools
The school district operates the following schools:

Secondary:
 Winfield High School
 Winfield Middle School

Primary:
 Country View Elementary School
 Irving Elementary School
 It was built in 1893 for Winfield's north ward. Its current building opened in 1963.
 Lowell Elementary School
 It was built in 1893 for Winfield's south ward. Its current building opened in 1958.
 Whittier Elementary School
 It opened in 1955 to serve areas along Mound Street.

Preschool:
 Early Learning Center

Former schools:
 Byrant Elementary School opened in 1884, serving the west ward. The Cowley County Historical Museum now uses the building.
 Stevenson Elementary School opened in 1925.
 Webster Elementary School opened in 1884, serving the east ward. In 1938 a replacement facility opened.  the district still used the original building.

When the district first established its elementary schools, each one was intended for a particular ward and was named after a poet.

See also
 Kansas State Department of Education
 Kansas State High School Activities Association
 List of high schools in Kansas
 List of unified school districts in Kansas

References

External links
 

School districts in Kansas
Education in Cowley County, Kansas